Events from the year 1851 in China.

Incumbents 
 Xianfeng Emperor (1st year)

Viceroys
 Viceroy of Zhili — Nergingge
 Viceroy of Min-Zhe 
 Yutai
 Ji Zhichang
 Viceroy of Huguang 
 Yutai
 Viceroy of Shaan-Gan 
 Qishan 
 Saying'a (acting) 
 Yutai
 Šuhingga (acting, then de jure)
 Viceroy of Liangguang — Xu Guangjin
 Viceroy of Yun-Gui 
 Cheng Yucai
 Wu Wenrong
 Viceroy of Sichuan — Xu Zechun

Events 

 Nian Rebellion
 the Nian begins raiding the grain stores and silver caches of villages. 
 Taiping Rebellion
 Jintian Uprising
 Mujangga dismissed from all government positions
 the first huiguan, the Kong Chow Company emerged seeing that the majority of Chinese already settled in California were connected to six districts collectively called Gangzhou

Births 
 Chung On Siew (鄭安壽, 1851 -  1907), emigrated to British Malaya

Deaths 
 Chui A-poo (?-1851), hangs himself before the British are able to exile him to Van Diemens Land

References